Yossi Kuperwasser is an Israeli intelligence and security expert.  Formerly, Kuperwasser served as the head of the research division in the Israel Defence Force (IDF) Military Intelligence division and Director General of the Israel Ministry of Strategic Affairs.

At the moment, Kuperwasser is a Senior Project Manager at the Jerusalem Center for Public Affairs (JCPA) specializing in the security dimensions of the Israeli-Palestinian Conflict.

Career 
After completing his conscription (compulsory military service) as a Rifleman in a Light Infantry Regiment, Kuperwasser was commissioned as an Officer in the Artillery Corps in 1976, in a position in which he was a Forward Observer embedded with frontline Infantry, Special Forces and Armoured Corps teams during the 1978 South Lebanon conflict and the 1982 Lebanon War. During his stint as a young officer in the Artillery, he also completed a licensed course on flying observer Helicopters and was for a time an "Air Observer" i.e a helicopter pilot spotting targets for the Artillery. In 1985 he became a Battery Commander of a Self-Propelled Artillery unit. In 1987 he was seconded to the Military Intelligence Directorate, in which he served in many different capacities. For two-years, beginning in 1992, he was the Assistant Defense Attache for Intelligence at the Israeli Embassy in Washington, D.C.. Four years later, Kuperwasser became an Intelligence Officer at the IDF's Central Command for three years. Following this position, Kuperwasser immediately assumed the role as Head of the Analysis and Production Division of the IDF Directorate of Military Intelligence. According to his profile IDC Herzliya's International Institute for Counter-Terrorism, during his time in this role "He has a significant role in determining Israel's coping methods with terror as well as regional developments, and sharing such analysis with the US and other foreign entities."

In response to an interview The Atlantic's Jeffrey Goldberg did with former President Barack Obama in 2015, Goldberg republished Kupperwasser's critique in its entirety. "I received any number of interesting responses, but few were as comprehensive as that of Yossi Kupperwasser," Goldberg stated. Kuperwasser concluded by asserting:In short, even though Israel, under Prime Minister Netanyahu, remains committed to the formula of “two states for two peoples, with mutual recognition,” the implementation of this idea at this point is irrelevant. The PA’s poor governance and the general turmoil in the Middle East render any establishment of a Palestinian state right now unviable. President Obama admitted as much, reluctantly, but continued to criticize Netanyahu instead of betraying his optimist paradigm. Netanyahu’s realism would stray too far from the path Obama, and other Western leaders, have set in front of them. But while Obama and the optimists offer their critiques, Netanyahu and the realists will be on the ground, living with the consequences the optimists have wrought.Beyond his military experience, Kuperwasser has dedicated much of his time in recent years to academic and journalistic endeavours. His writings have appeared in Haaretz, the Begin-Sadat Center for Strategic Studies, and the Jerusalem Center for Public Affairs (the latter two being Israeli think-tanks).

Publications

Jerusalem Center for Public Affairs (JCPA) 
"The Real Marwan Barghouti," April 19, 2017, http://jcpa.org/video/real-marwan-barghouti/\

"Is there a Palestinian Partner?" May 18, 2017, http://jcpa.org/is-there-a-palestinian-partner/

"Did the Palestinian Authority Really Cut Off Payments to Terrorist Prisoners?" June 5, 2017, http://jcpa.org/question-day-palestinian-authority-really-cut-off-payments-terrorist-prisoners/

"Foreign Affairs and Defense Committee meeting at Knesset with Ambassador Dore Gold," June 7, 2017, http://jcpa.org/video/foreign-affairs-defense-committee/

"Palestinian Payments to Incarcerated Terrorists and Martyrs' Families Rise in 2017," July 14, 2017, http://jcpa.org/article/palestinian-payments-incarcerated-terrorists-martyrs-families-rise-2017/

"Why Israel is Concerned About American-Russian Understandings of Syria," July 30, 2017, http://jcpa.org/israel-concerned-american-russian-understandings-syria/

"How the Palestinians view the Balfour Declaration Today," March 1, 2017, http://jcpa.org/video/palestinians-view-balfour-declaration-today/

Haaretz 
"The True Face of the Palestinian Leader," January 13, 2016, http://www.haaretz.com/opinion/.premium-1.697077

"For Palestinians, Conflict with Jews is Existential in Nature," October 12, 2015, http://www.haaretz.com/opinion/.premium-1.680102

"Israel Must Continue to Fight the Iran Deal in Congress," September 9, 2015, http://www.haaretz.com/opinion/.premium-1.675351

"No Prospect for Genuine Israeli-Palestinian Peace," March 25, 2015, http://www.haaretz.com/opinion/.premium-1.648598

The Begin-Sadat Center for Strategic Studies 
"The Struggle over the Iranian Nuclear Program," February 26, 2015, https://besacenter.org/perspectives-papers/the-struggle-over-the-iranian-nuclear-program

"Israel's Role in the Struggle over the Iranian Nuclear Project," June 11, 2015, https://besacenter.org/mideast-security-and-policy-studies/israels-role-in-the-struggle-over-the-iranian-nuclear-project/

Fathom Journal 

"The Rashida Tlaib and Ilhan Omar Affair – what we learned about the Democratic Party," October, 2019, https://fathomjournal.org/the-rashida-tlaib-and-ilan-omar-affair-what-we-learned-about-the-democratic-party/

"‘We have to share the land somehow. But for peace, the Palestinians must change their narrative’: an interview with Yossi Kuperwasser," Autumn, 2017, https://fathomjournal.org/we-have-to-share-the-land-somehow-but-for-peace-the-palestinians-must-change-their-narrative-an-interview-with-yossi-kupperwasser/?highlight=narrative%20

References

Year of birth missing (living people)
Living people
Israeli generals